Scoparia chalicodes is a species of moth in the family Crambidae. This species was named by Edward Meyrick in 1884. Meyrick gave a fuller description of this species in 1885. S. chalicodes is endemic to New Zealand.

The wingspan is 15.5–16.5 mm. The forewings are light ochreous-grey, irrorated with white. The veins are irregularly and partially lined with blackish. The first line is pale greyish-ochreous, obscurely dark-margined. The second line is very obscure and the subterminal line is cloudy and whitish. The hindwings are grey-whitish. Adults have been recorded on wing from January to March.

References

Moths described in 1884
Moths of New Zealand
Scorparia
Endemic fauna of New Zealand
Taxa named by Edward Meyrick
Endemic moths of New Zealand